James Walker Harper was an Anglican priest in the late 19th and early 20th centuries.

He was born in 1859, educated at Aberdeen Grammar School and the city's university   and ordained in 1881. After  curacies at Holy Trinity Stirling and St Paul's, Edinburgh he held an incumbency at St Margaret's, Leven, Fife. He was Dean of  St Andrews, Dunkeld and Dunblane from 1927  until his death on  23 June 1938.

References

1859 births
Clergy from Aberdeen
People educated at Aberdeen Grammar School
Alumni of the University of Aberdeen
Scottish Episcopalian priests
Deans of St Andrews, Dunkeld and Dunblane
1938 deaths